Charles Nash may refer to:

Charles E. Nash (1844–1913), U.S. Representative from Louisiana
Charles Francis Nash (died 1942), airman for the Royal Canadian Air Force in World War II, buried at the Cedar Grove Cemetery (Portsmouth, Virginia)
Charles W. Nash (1864–1948), United States automobile entrepreneur
Charles William Nash (1848–1926), Canadian biologist and scientific illustrator (wikisource:Author:Charles William Nash, commons:Category:Charles William Nash (biologist))
Charlie Nash (boxer) (born 1951), Irish Olympic boxer